Laugarvatn is the name of a lake and a small town in the south of Iceland. The lake is smaller than the neighbouring Apavatn.

Tourism
Laugarvatn lies within the Golden Circle, a popular tourist route, and acts as a staging post. The town has a population of about 200, and lies predominantly along the west side of the lake. The lake contains geothermal springs under its surface, making it a popular swimming spot with some warm patches along the shoreline year-round.

Education
Menntaskólinn að Laugarvatni (ML), a boarding gymnasium with approximately 200 students, is located in the town. Iceland University of Education's division of Sport and Physical Education was also located here.

See also
List of lakes of Iceland

References

External links
http://www.nat.is/travelguideeng/laugarvatn.htm (Information)
Laugarvatn

Populated places in Iceland
Lakes of Iceland